The 1986 Missouri Valley Conference men's basketball tournament was played after the conclusion of the 1985–1986 regular season at the Tulsa Convention Center in Tulsa, Oklahoma.

The Tulsa Golden Hurricane defeated the ninth ranked Bradley Braves, 74-58, in the championship game and as a result won their 3rd MVC Tournament title to earn an automatic bid to the 1986 NCAA tournament.

Bracket

References

1985–86 Missouri Valley Conference men's basketball season
Missouri Valley Conference men's basketball tournament
Missouri Valley Conference men's basketball tournament